Yvan Delporte (24 June 1928 – 5 March 2007) was a Belgian comics writer, and was editor-in-chief of Spirou magazine between 1955 and 1968 during a period considered by many the golden age of Franco-Belgian comics. He is credited with several creative contributions, among these his collaborations with Peyo on The Smurfs, with René Follet on Steve Severin (1/2) and André Franquin with the creation of Gaston Lagaffe and the co-authorship of Idées noires.

Biography
Delporte started at Spirou at the age of 17. Where his first job was to retouch the cleavage in American comics which at the time were considered excessively lewd. He handled other odd jobs, and over time touched upon a great deal of different occupations within the comics industry. In 1955, upon becoming editor-in-chief of Spirou in place of Charles Dupuis, a long-lasting collaboration with Franquin began, which would spawn many creations.

References

 Delporte publications dans Le journal de Spirou BDoubliées
 Delporte albums Bedetheque 

Footnotes

Further reading
Yvan Delporte, Réacteur en chef, by Christelle & Bertrand Pissavy-Yvernault, Dupuis, September 2009

External links

Yvan Delporte biography on Lambiek Comiclopedia
Yvan Delporte biography on Dupuis

1928 births
2007 deaths
Writers from Brussels
Belgian comics writers
Belgian editors
Belgian magazine editors
Belgian humorists
Comic book editors